Patrice Laliberté is a Canadian film and television director and screenwriter from Quebec. He is most noted for his 2015 short film Overpass (Viaduc), which won the Toronto International Film Festival award for Best Canadian Short Film at the 2015 Toronto International Film Festival and was a shortlisted Canadian Screen Award nominee for Best Live Action Short Drama at the 4th Canadian Screen Awards.

He has also directed the short films Je t'aime à la livre (2009), Laisser don'faire (2011), Le souffle que l'on retient (2014), Le cycle des moteurs (2014) and Late Night Drama (2016), and the television miniseries La Boîte à malle (2012) and GAME(R) (2017).

His feature film debut, The Decline (Jusqu'au déclin), was the first feature film from Quebec to be distributed as a Netflix original film. The film had a theatrical premiere at the Rendez-vous Québec Cinéma in February 2020 before its launch on Netflix. He produced the film with his company Couronne Nord. 

His second feature film, Very Nice Day (Très belle journée), was released in 2022.

References

External links

21st-century Canadian screenwriters
Film directors from Quebec
Canadian television directors
Canadian male screenwriters
Canadian screenwriters in French
French Quebecers
Living people
Year of birth missing (living people)